Mario Alberto Kempes Chiodi (born 15 July 1954) is an Argentine former professional footballer who played as a striker or attacking midfielder. A prolific goalscorer, he finished as La Liga's top goalscorer twice with Valencia where he amassed 116 goals in 184 league games.

At international level, Kempes was the focal point of Argentina's 1978 World Cup win where he scored twice in the final and received the Golden Boot as top goalscorer. He also won the Golden Ball for the player of the tournament, making him one of only three players to have won all three awards at a single World Cup, along with Garrincha in 1962 and Paolo Rossi in 1982.

Kempes won South American Footballer of the Year, Onze d'Or European footballer of the Year and World Cup Golden Ball in 1978. In 2004, he was named as one of the Top 125 greatest living footballers as part of FIFA's 100th anniversary celebration. Kempes was nicknamed El Toro and El Matador.

Club career

Kempes was born in Bell Ville, Córdoba. His father, Mario Quemp, was of German heritage. His mother, Teresa Chiodi, was Italian. At the age of seven he began playing with a junior team and at fourteen he joined the Talleres reserves.

Kempes' career started at local club Instituto, where he played alongside Osvaldo Ardiles before quickly moving on to Rosario Central, where he established himself as a remarkable goalscorer, scoring 85 goals in 105 matches, prompting Valencia to sign him. At Mestalla he would go on to win the Copa del Rey, the European Cup Winners' Cup and the UEFA Super Cup as well as two consecutive Pichichis, scoring 24 and 28 goals in the 1976–77 and 1977–78 seasons. Famous as a hard-working forward, he used to strike from outside the penalty area with his surging runs towards goal and was not the traditional center-forward operating solely inside the box. Many defenders found difficulty handling his attacking style.

Before the 1978 World Cup, Kempes was the only foreign-based player on the list of coach César Luis Menotti's Argentina national team. when announcing the squad he had selected for the 1978 tournament, Menotti described him with these words: "He's strong, he's got skill, he creates spaces and he shoots hard. He's a player who can make a difference, and he can play in a centre-forward position."

Kempes had been the top scorer in La Liga the previous two seasons and was determined to show on home soil that he could deliver against the best on the sport's greatest stage. However, he had failed to get on the score-sheet in West Germany in 1974, at the age of 20, and after the first round group stage in 1978, his name was still missing among goal scorers in the tournament.

After leaving Valencia in 1984, Kempes spent two years at Hércules in nearby Alicante before spending six years at various Austrian clubs. His play declined in his 30s and he did not compete for top scorer honours in the Austrian top flight. He rounded off his career with stints at more obscure clubs in Indonesia, Chile and Albania during the 1990s.

International career

During his club career he won 43 caps for Argentina and scored 20 times. He represented his country in three World Cups in 1974, 1978 and 1982, winning the competition in 1978. He was the leading goalscorer in the 1978 tournament, scoring six goals in three braces: the first two in Argentina's first semi-final group stage match against Poland, another two against Peru, and the last two in the final against the Netherlands, which Argentina won 3–1. His second goal, in the 105th minute, was the game winner in extra time. However, in the same tournament, he notoriously stopped a goal with his hand in a second-round match against Poland. This resulted in a penalty kick that was promptly saved by Ubaldo Fillol. His goals in the 1978 World Cup Final were his last for Argentina at the age of just 23.

In 1978, he was named South American Football Player of the Year ("El Mundo," Caracas, Venezuela). He was named by Pelé as one of the top 125 greatest living footballers in March 2004.

Managerial career
Kempes made his full-time managing debut in Albania. His brief spell with Lushnja was groundbreaking, as he became the first foreign manager who signed a foreign player in Albanian football history. His career in Albania came to a quick end in 1997. The following year, he landed a job with Venezuelan side Mineros de Guayana. In 1999, Kempes moved to Bolivia and managed The Strongest, before taking charge of Blooming in 2000. Previously, he had worked as assistant coach for Uruguayan manager Héctor Núñez in Valencia and as a player-manager of Indonesian League champions Pelita Jaya.

Commentary career
He currently works as a football analyst and commentator in Spanish for ESPN Deportes (ESPN's Spanish-language version). With Fernando Palomo and Ciro Procuna he provides the commentary in the Latin American version of the FIFA franchise video games FIFA 13, FIFA 14, FIFA 15, FIFA 16, FIFA 17, FIFA 18, FIFA 19, FIFA 20, FIFA 21, FIFA 22 and FIFA 23.

Career statistics

Club

International

Scores and results list Argentina's goal tally first, score column indicates score after each Kempes goal.

Honours
Valencia
Copa del Rey: 1978–79
UEFA Cup Winners' Cup: 1979–80
UEFA Super Cup: 1980

River Plate
Primera División: 1981 Nacional

Pelita Jaya
Galatama: 1993–94 

Argentina
FIFA World Cup: 1978

Individual
Argentine Primera División top scorers: 1974 Nacional, 1976 Metropolitan
Pichichi Trophy: 1977, 1978
FIFA World Cup Golden Boot: 1978
FIFA World Cup Golden Ball: 1978
FIFA World Cup All-Star Team: 1978
Ballon d'Or: 1978 - Le nouveau palmarès (the new winners)
Onze d'Or: 1978
Olimpia de Plata: 1978
South American Footballer of the Year: 1978
UEFA Cup Winners' Cup top scorers: 1979–80
FIFA 100: 2004
South American Player of the Century: Ranking Nº 23: 2006
Golden Foot: 2007, as football legend
Estadio Mario Alberto Kempes: 2010, The stadium in Córdoba, Argentina was named after him.
AFA Team of All Time (published 2015)

References

External links

 
 
 
 
 
 
 Observer Sport biography
  
 

1954 births
Living people
Sportspeople from Córdoba Province, Argentina
Argentine footballers
Instituto footballers
Club Atlético River Plate footballers
Association football forwards
SKN St. Pölten players
Rosario Central footballers
C.D. Arturo Fernández Vial footballers
FIFA 100
FIFA World Cup-winning players
1974 FIFA World Cup players
1978 FIFA World Cup players
1982 FIFA World Cup players
1975 Copa América players
Argentina international footballers
La Liga players
Valencia CF players
Hércules CF players
First Vienna FC players
Pelita Bandung Raya players
Argentine people of German descent
Argentine people of Italian descent
Argentine expatriate footballers
Argentine beach soccer players
Argentine football managers
KS Lushnja managers
Mineros de Guayana managers
The Strongest managers
Club Blooming managers
Independiente Petrolero managers
Pichichi Trophy winners
Primera B de Chile players
Argentine Primera División players
Austrian Football Bundesliga players
Expatriate footballers in Chile
Argentine expatriate sportspeople in Chile
Argentine expatriate sportspeople in Austria
Argentine expatriate sportspeople in Spain
Expatriate footballers in Austria
Expatriate footballers in Indonesia
South American Footballer of the Year winners
Expatriate football managers in Albania
Expatriate football managers in Bolivia
Expatriate football managers in Indonesia
Expatriate football managers in Venezuela
Argentine expatriate sportspeople in Indonesia
Argentine expatriate sportspeople in Albania
Argentine expatriate sportspeople in Italy
Argentine expatriate sportspeople in Bolivia
Argentine expatriate sportspeople in Venezuela
Expatriate football managers in Italy
Expatriate football managers in Spain
Segunda División B managers